The Ministry of Foreign Economic Relations of the Republic of Serbia was the ministry in the Government of Serbia which was in charge of foreign economic Relations of Serbia. The ministry was abolished on 15 May 2007.

History
The ministry was established on 11 February 1991. It was abolished on 15 May 2007 when it merged into the Ministry of Economy and Regional Development. Also, the newly established Ministry of National Investment Plan (formally year later) took some of its jurisdictions.

List of ministers

See also
 Ministry of Economy

External links
 Serbian Ministry of Foreign Economic Relations

Defunct government ministries of Serbia
1991 establishments in Serbia
Ministries established in 1991
2007 disestablishments in Serbia
Ministries disestablished in 2007